The Extraordinary and Plenipotentiary Ambassador of Peru to the Kingdom of Spain is the official representative of the Republic of Peru to the Kingdom of Spain, being also accredited to the Principality of Andorra.

Peru and Spain officially established relations in August 15, 1879, under Alfonso XII and have since maintained diplomatic relations with a brief exception during the years 1936 to 1939 as a result of the Spanish Civil War.

Andorra and Peru officially established relations on June 3, 1997.

List of representatives

Representatives (1826–1879)

Representatives (1879–present)

See also
List of ambassadors of Spain to Peru
List of ambassadors of Peru to Morocco
List of ambassadors of Peru to Portugal

References

Ambassadors of Peru to Spain
Spain
Peru